Antonis Iliadis (born 27 July 1993) is a Greek professional footballer who plays as a left winger.

Club career
Iliadis began his professional career at Makrochori. He played in PAS Giannina from 2014 to 2016 at Greek Superleague. On 6 June 2016, he signed with Platanias on a three-year deal. After making only 3 appearances he left the club by mutual consent. On 9 January 2017 he joined Iraklis.

References

External links
 

1993 births
Living people
Greek footballers
Association football defenders
Atromitos F.C. players
PAS Giannina F.C. players
Platanias F.C. players
Iraklis Thessaloniki F.C. players
Super League Greece players
People from Imathia
Footballers from Central Macedonia